USS Henry R. Kenyon (DE-683) was a Buckley-class destroyer escort in service with the United States Navy from 1943 to 1947. She was sold for scrap in 1970.

The ship was named in honor of Ensign Henry R. Kenyon, Jr. (1916–1942), a naval aviator in squadron VT-8, who was killed in action in the Battle of Midway.

Namesake
Henry Russell Kenyon Jr. was born on 4 February 1916 in Bronxville, New York. He enlisted in the United States Navy on 5 November 1940. He was discharged in 1941 to accept an appointment as Aviation Cadet and was commissioned Ensign on 4 August 1941. After undergoing advanced flight training Kenyon joined Torpedo Squadron 8 (VT-8) for duty in the Pacific Theater.

Kenyon flew as a member of that squadron from the aircraft carrier  in the Battle of Midway on 4 June 1942. After takeoff, the squadron lost contact with the rest of Hornet's strike force, and subsequently found the Japanese carriers alone. Knowing that they lacked fighter cover, Kenyon and his comrades attacked until all were shot down. Ens. Kenyon was presumed dead 5 June 1942 and was awarded the Navy Cross posthumously for his heroic actions.

History
Henry R. Kenyon was launched by Bethlehem Steel Co.'s Fore River Shipyard, Quincy, Massachusetts, on 30 October 1943; sponsored by Mrs. Verna Markham Kenyon, widow; and commissioned on 30 November 1943.

Battle of the Atlantic
After her shakedown cruise off Bermuda, Henry R. Kenyon returned to Boston. She was underway on 26 January 1944 on a tour of convoy escort duty in the Caribbean, a fertile field for German submarines. Returning to Boston again on 6 June, the ship underwent training in Casco Bay, Maine, and had her torpedo tubes replaced by additional antiaircraft guns. Assigned to an Atlantic escort group, she made five transatlantic voyages between 4 July 1944 and 30 August 1945, providing antisubmarine and antiaircraft protection in the Atlantic and eastern Mediterranean.

Pacific War
With the Battle of the Atlantic won, the destroyer escort proceeded on 15 May from Norfolk, Virginia through the Panama Canal and into the western Pacific theater. Arriving off Leyte on 7 July, she spent the remainder of the war escorting ships in the Philippines and to New Guinea and Okinawa. After the surrender of Japan in August, Henry R. Kenyon continued to operate in the Philippines and off the coast of Japan until departing Manila for the United States on 26 November.

Arriving at San Diego, California on 17 December, she remained in that port except for periodic training cruises until decommissioning on 3 February 1947. She joined the Pacific Reserve Fleet and berthed at Mare Island, Calif., later to be moved to Stockton, Calif.

Fate
Henry R. Kenyon was stricken from the Navy Register on 1 December 1969. The ship was sold for scrap on 22 October 1970.

References

External links  

     navsource.org: USS Henry R. Kenyon
   hazegray.org: USS Henry R. Kenyon

Buckley-class destroyer escorts
Ships built in Quincy, Massachusetts
1943 ships